Süheyl Yeşilnur (born 29 May 1953) is a Turkish judoka. He competed at the 1976 Summer Olympics and the 1984 Summer Olympics.

References

1953 births
Living people
Turkish male judoka
Olympic judoka of Turkey
Judoka at the 1976 Summer Olympics
Judoka at the 1984 Summer Olympics
Place of birth missing (living people)
20th-century Turkish people